IK Uppsala Fotboll is a football club from Uppsala, in Uppsala County, Sweden. The club was established in 2016 when IK Sirius Fotboll's women's section decided to reform as an independent club. It was promoted into the women's Premier Division (Damallsvenskan) for the first time in 2019.

The club play their home games at Studenternas IP in Uppsala. The team colours are dark red and white. The club is affiliated to the Upplands Fotbollförbund.

On 5 December 2022, the Swedish Football Association announced that Eskilstuna United DFF club was denied for failing to fulfill economic requirements, and weren't allowed to play the 2023 Damallsvenskan and instead were relegated to Elitettan. Eskilstuna United DFF appealed, but on 2 January 2023, the Swedish Football Association announced that instead, IK Uppsala would be promoted.

Personnel
Updated as of 3 August 2022.

Current technical staff

Current squad
.

Former players
For details of current and former players, see :Category:IK Uppsala Fotboll players.

References

External links
 IK Uppsala Fotboll – Official website 

Women's football clubs in Sweden
2016 establishments in Sweden
Damallsvenskan teams
Association football clubs established in 2016
Sport in Uppsala County